Werner Fehr (1885 – 6 October 1963) was a Swiss equestrian. He competed in two events at the 1924 Summer Olympics.

References

External links
 

1885 births
1963 deaths
Swiss male equestrians
Olympic equestrians of Switzerland
Equestrians at the 1924 Summer Olympics
Place of birth missing